Ficus lauretana is a species of plant in the family Moraceae. It is found in Brazil, Colombia, and Peru.

References

lauretana
Least concern plants
Plants described in 1984
Taxonomy articles created by Polbot